Mian Haji Sahib is a town in the Islamabad Capital Territory of Pakistan. It is located at 33° 22' 50N 73° 20' 40E with an altitude of 479 metres (1574 feet).

References 

Union councils of Islamabad Capital Territory